The 2003 Women's National Soccer League, known as the Ansett Summer Series under a sponsorship arrangement with Ansett Australia, was the eighth season of the Women's National Soccer League, the Australian national women's soccer competition. The season was played over 10 rounds followed by a grand final match between the top two teams. Queensland Sting finished first in the league however second-placed NSW Sapphires were crowned champions after winning the grand final.

Clubs
Teams in the 2003 WNSL:

Regular season

League table

Home and away season
The 2003 WNSL season was played over 10 rounds, followed by a grand final between the top two teams in the league, starting in October and completing in December 2009. While all teams played each other twice, not all teams played each other home and away with several rounds hosted in a single location.

† Match hosted by "away" team.

Grand final
Queensland Sting entered the grand final without losing a match in the league, only missing out on points in two draws against NSW Sapphires.

Awards
Golden Boot:
Catherine Cannuli, NSW Sapphires

References

Aus
1